Bulbophyllum phalaenopsis is a species of orchid in the genus Bulbophyllum. Its flowers' fragrance is that of rotting meat that attracts flies which pollinate them.

References
The Bulbophyllum-Checklist
The Internet Orchid Species Photo Encyclopedia

phalaenopsis